The 1991 Nepal census was a widespread national census conducted by the Nepal Central Bureau of Statistics.

Working with Nepal's Village Development Committees at a district level,
they recorded data from all the main towns and villages of each district of the country. The data included statistics on population size, households, sex and age distribution, place of birth, residence characteristics, literacy, marital status, religion, language spoken, caste/ethnic group, economically active population, education, number of children, employment status, and occupation.

This census was followed by the 2001 Nepal census.

References

See also

 List of village development committees of Nepal (Former)
 2001 Nepal census
 2011 Nepal census

Censuses in Nepal
Nepal
1991 in Nepal